Vendémiaire was the first month in the French Republican calendar. The month was named after the Occitan word vendemiaire (grape harvester).

Vendémiaire was the first month of the autumn quarter (mois d'automne). It started on the day of the autumnal equinox, which fell between 22 September and 24 September, inclusive. It thus ended between 21 October and 23 October, and was the season of the vintage in the wine districts of northern France. It follows the Sansculottides of the past year and precedes Brumaire.

Day name table 

Like all FRC months Vendémiaire lasted 30 days and was divided into three 10-day weeks, called décades (decades). In accordance with the suggestion of Fabre d'Églantine, each of the days of the republican year was consecrated to some useful object. Thus every day in Vendémiaire had the name of an agricultural or ornamental plant, except the 5th (Quintidi) and 10th day (Decadi) of every decade, which had the name of a domestic animal (Quintidi) or an agricultural tool (Decadi).

Conversion table

References

External links 
Autumn Quarter of Year II (facsimile)

French Republican calendar
September
October

sv:Franska revolutionskalendern#Månaderna